Roger Establet Polity (born 1938) is a French scholar of the sociology of education. A student of Louis Althusser, Establet is an emeritus professor at University of Provence.

A student at the lycée in Nice, and khâgne at the Lycée Louis-le-Grand in Paris, in 1959 he entered the école normale supérieure, where he earned degrees in philosophy and sociology. He often collaborates with Christian Baudelot, a sociologist at the École normale supérieure. He was involved in Althusser's Reading Capital project.

Works 
 L'École capitaliste en France, 1970 (with Christian Baudelot)
 Le niveau monte (with Christian Baudelot)
 (with Christian Baudelot) Suicide: The Hidden Side of Modernity (2008).

References 

École Normale Supérieure alumni
French sociologists
1938 births
Living people
Academic staff of the University of Provence
French male writers